Walter James Sinton (1911–1980) was a notable New Zealand butcher, musical retailing manager, percussionist, broadcaster and concert impresario. He was born in Dunedin, Otago, New Zealand in 1911.

References

1911 births
1980 deaths
New Zealand butchers
Musicians from Dunedin
New Zealand percussionists